Tsuen Wan Environmental Resource Centre is housed in Old House, Hoi Pa Village, in Tak Wah Park, Tak Wah Street, Tsuen Wan, Hong Kong.

History
The Old House, is originally one of the houses of former Hoi Pa Village, a Hakka mixed-lineage village. It was built by Mr. Yau Yuen-cheung (1865–1937), a village scholar of Hoi Pa Village. The old house was built with rammed earth, green bricks, green tiles and timber. It is a fine example of traditional southern Chinese village architecture.

The village house, together with the adjacent areas, has now been developed into the Tak Wah Park.

After the Antiquities and Monuments Office had given approval to convert the historical village house into an environment resource centre, the renovation work was done. The Centre was opened in December 1997. It is a joint venture of the Environmental Protection Department and the Conservancy Association. 
It has been a declared monument since 1986.

Facilities
There is a library, a computer room, an AV room, an exhibition area and Green Home Exhibition Area.

A Chinese plaque says Eco Place and a Chinese couplet says Happy are people in this house environed by green trees; birds fly freely around this place surrounded by bamboo which are found hanging at the entrance of the Centre.

External links

Environmental Protection Department information about the Centre
Virtual tour of Tsuen Wan Environmental Resource Centre
 Antiquities and Monuments Office - Old House, Hoi Pa Village
 Film Service Office entry

Museums in Hong Kong
Declared monuments of Hong Kong
Nature centres in Hong Kong
Tsuen Wan